IK Oskarshamn is an ice hockey club from Oskarshamn in Sweden. The team plays in the top-tier league, SHL, after succeeding through the 2019 SHL qualifiers and thus earning promotion to the SHL. The 2019–20 season will be the team's first season in the top-tier league.

History 
IK Oskarshamn (abbreviated as IKO) was founded on 27 May 1970 when the ice hockey sections of Oskarshamns AIK and IFK Oskarshamn were merged into one club. Originally known as AIK–IFK Oskarshamn, it adopted the name IK70 for the 1972–1973 season, and finally IK Oskarshamn in 1986.

The team thrice reached the final qualification stage for the highest league in Sweden before their promotion there. This happened in the 2000–01, 2004–05 as well as the 2018–19 season.
The team plays its home games in Be-Ge Hockey Center which has a capacity of 3,275 people. The arena was first built in 1974 but was completely renovated and enlarged in 2005.

Seasons 
In the 2000–01 season and in the 2004–05 season IK Oskarshamn succeeded to reach the Kvalserien. In Kvalserien the team finished in 5th place the first year and in 6th place the second year.
In the 2010–11 season IK Oskarshamn finished 9th in Hockeyallsvenskan, six points from playing in the new pre-qualification.

Both in 2011–12 season and in 2012–13 season IK Oskarshamn finished topp-7 and reached the Playoff round. IK Oskarshamns Evan McGrath was the top scorer in the HockeyAllsvenskan regular season with 50 points in 52 games.

Players and personnel

Current roster

Source: eliteprospects.comAs of 16 March 2023.

Head coaches

Honored members

Tomas Björnström was a proud servant who in ten seasons totalled 229 points for Oskarshamn. He is the first player in IK Oskarshamn who have his number retired and hoisted to the roof.

Fredric Jaensson played a total of nine seasons in the club. Notably, when he left the club after the 2007–08 season, he had a total of 318 points in the HockeyAllsvenskan. It was at that time the most points of all Allsvenskan players in franchise history. His Jersey was hoisted to the rafters on 20 September 2008.

Skeeter Moore and Peter Ekroth were recruited to the club in 1992 by then chairman Evert Mellström. The acquisitions were notable because the players came from the Elitserien with IK Oskarshamn then playing in Division 3. In only three seasons, the team climbed from division 3 to the division 1 (HockeyAllsvenskan) the country's second tier competition. During a celebration ceremony on December 6, 2010, Ekroth's and Moore's jerseys were hoisted up in the roof of Arena Oskarshamn.

Alexander Johansson is an IKO icon that came to the club in the 1999–2000 season and played 528 matches in 12 seasons for the club. The 2010–11 season was his last season for IK Oskarshamn. The club raised his jersey to the rafters in a pre-game ceremony against Leksands IF on 27 December 2011.

Notable former players 

 Per Gustafsson
 Mathias Johansson
 Greg Mauldin
 Niklas Hjalmarsson
 Stefan Pettersson
 David Rodman
 Evan McGrath
 Eetu Qvist

References

External links

Official home page

Oskarshamn
Swedish Hockey League teams
Oskarshamn IK
Oskarshamn IK
1970 establishments in Sweden
Ice hockey clubs established in 1970